Taishang is a town of Ji'an, Jilin, China. , it has two residential communities and 12 villages under its administration.

References

Township-level divisions of Jilin
Ji'an, Jilin